The event was being held for the first time since 1979.

Colin Dibley and John James won the title, defeating Craig Edwards and Eddie Edwards 6–3, 6–4 in the final.

Seeds

  Ross Case /  Geoff Masters (quarterfinals)
  Tom Gullikson /  Chris Lewis (semifinals)
  Syd Ball /  Cliff Letcher (quarterfinals)
  Colin Dibley /  John James (champions)

Draw

Draw

References
Draw

Next Generation Adelaide International
1981 Grand Prix (tennis)
1981 in Australian tennis